The Hahn family of Los Angeles, California has been active in regional and national politics since the mid-20th century. In 2001 the Los Angeles Times wrote "their political strength has been compared with the Daleys of Chicago."

 Gordon Hahn (1919–2001), California State Assembly and Los Angeles City Council
 Kenneth Hahn (1920–1997), Los Angeles County Supervisor, namesake of Kenneth Hahn State Recreation Area and Kenneth Hahn Hall of Administration  
 James Hahn (b. 1950), former Mayor of Los Angeles
 Janice Hahn (b. 1952), former U.S. Representative

References 

Families from California
Political history of Greater Los Angeles
History of Los Angeles County, California
People from Greater Los Angeles